Edwardstown is an inner southern-western suburb located 6 km southwest of Adelaide in the City of Marion.

In 1989 the suburb of Edwardstown was split, with the portion east of South Road becoming Melrose Park. This occurred as the suburb was quite large, located on either side of South Road and was in the jurisdiction of two local government councils, with the larger western side belonging to the City of Marion.

Edwardstown is in the South Australian House of Assembly districts of Badcoe and Elder, and the Australian House of Representatives Division of Boothby. Edwardstown is home to the Castle Plaza Shopping Centre.

Edwardstown is served by the Woodlands Park and Edwardstown railway stations. The current suburb of Edwardstown includes localities previously known as Hammersmith, Woodlands Park, St Mary's West, Ackland Gardens and Mirreen.

See also
List of Adelaide suburbs
Electoral district of Edwardstown

References

Suburbs of Adelaide